Common ARTS (or Automated Radar Terminal System) is an air traffic control computer system that air traffic controllers use to track aircraft. 

The computer system is used to automate the air traffic controller's job by correlating the various radar and human inputs in a meaningful way. This system is being used in most of the TRACONs around the United States. Common ARTS is the most modern implementation of ARTS in use at various locations in the United States. Standard Terminal Automation Replacement System (STARS) was designed to replace Common ARTS at all the US TRACONS, however that project was stalled until 2010.  

The United States Federal Aviation Administration announced in Spring 2011 that STARS will be replacing the 11 largest CARTS sites under the TAMR Segment 3 Phase 1 plan. The remaining CARTS sites will be replaced under TAMR Segment 3 Phase 2 in the near future.

RADAR Automation

A typical short range radar used in air traffic control will scan the area about 60 miles every 4–6 seconds. The primary signal returned will contain a range and azimuth of a target. Automation will correlate these targets scan to scan and make estimates of speed and direction. A secondary signal (Transponder (aviation)) may be available, containing the aircraft transponder code, and possibly altitude (and possibly other information if Mode S). The automation will correlate the primary and secondary signals, and measure horizontal and vertical speed estimates. 

Once the automation systems know the details of the aircraft it is tracking, this information is available on the display, as part of the datablock near the aircraft representation. The information will typically show an aircraft ID, if the transponder code is associated with a known flight plan, the altitude, and speed. 

Other systems can use the speed and direction information. The safety systems need to use this information. The conflict alert (CA) system will compare the direction, altitude and speed of multiple aircraft to see if there are any possibilities of aircraft being too close together. Maps of the area along with Mode C or S transponder elevations will allow minimum safe altitude warning (MSAW) systems to warn controllers of possible terrain conflicts. 

Additional systems may include any of the Final Approach Spacing (FAST/pFAST) tools available, User Request Evaluation Tool, and Parallel Runway monitors.

History

ARTS was developed in the late 1960s by Univac corporation to help automate the TRACONS operations in the United States. At many TRACONs, a Unisys mainframe computer was installed to handle the processing. In the early 1970s virtually all TRACONs in the US were running ARTS software to help track aircraft displayed on the radar console. The Burroughs Corporation was also working on radar display consoles in the 1970s to 1980s. 

In 1986, Univac and Burroughs Corporations merged creating Unisys.

By the early 1980s an effort was proposed to port the ARTS functionality to microprocessors. Unisys began this program, and the name changed to CommonARTS. The CommonARTS processes were running on Motorola 68000 microprocessors. The software was mostly rewritten in the C language, running on various real-time operating systems. 

In the 1990s, Unisys split out some of the defense work, and Lockheed Martin acquired the air traffic management unit. 

In the 1990s, most of the Common ARTS software was ported to PowerPC processors, still using the same source code, but with larger memory footprint, allowing control of more aircraft. By 1997, there were 131 small to medium TRACONS and five large TRACONS running Common ARTS software. The PowerPC also allowed the display software to drive ARTS Color Displays (ACD) replacing the vector-based Full Digital ARTs Displays (FDAD). 

The STARS program was started to replace the Common ARTS systems at all TRACONS in the late 1990s. 

In the late 1990s Automatic dependent surveillance-broadcast (ADS-B) support was added to Common ARTS software to augment RADAR sensors. Multiple sensor inputs were added including long range (ARSR) allowing larger TRACONS to have variable size and shape sectors, since they no longer needed to have round coverage areas matching a single sensor scan area.

Sources 
   Look about page 18-21
http://www.usfamily.net/web/labenson/Legacy_files/Eagan_ATC_history.pdf
http://findarticles.com/p/articles/mi_m0GZQ/is_27_43/ai_89156890

http://www.linuxjournal.com/article/7066
http://www.tc.faa.gov/acb300/techreports/HighAltitude_memo.pdf

Air traffic control